In algebraic group theory, approximation theorems are an extension of the Chinese remainder theorem to algebraic groups G over global fields k.

History
 proved strong approximation for some classical groups.
Strong approximation was established in the 1960s and 1970s, for semisimple simply-connected algebraic groups over global fields. In the number field case Platonov also proved a related result over local fields called the Kneser–Tits conjecture.

Formal definitions and properties
Let G be a linear algebraic group over a global field k, and A the adele ring of k. If S is a non-empty finite set of places of k, then we write AS for the ring of S-adeles and AS for the product of the completions ks, for s in the finite set S. For any choice of S, G(k) embeds in G(AS) and G(AS).

The question asked in weak approximation is whether the embedding of G(k) in G(AS) has dense image. If the group G is connected and k-rational, then it satisfies weak approximation with respect to any set S . More generally, for any connected group G, there is a finite set T of finite places of k such that G satisfies weak approximation with respect to any set S that is disjoint with T . In particular, if k is an algebraic number field then any connected group G satisfies weak approximation with respect to the set S = S∞ of infinite places.

The question asked in strong approximation is whether the embedding of G(k) in G(AS) has dense image, or equivalently whether the set

G(k)G(AS)

is a dense subset in G(A). The main theorem of strong approximation  states that a non-solvable linear algebraic group G over a global field k has strong approximation for the finite set S if and only if its radical N is unipotent, G/N is simply connected, and each almost simple component H of G/N has a non-compact component Hs for some s in S (depending on H).

The proofs of strong approximation depended on the Hasse principle for algebraic groups, which for groups of type E8 was only proved several years later.

Weak approximation holds for a broader class of groups, including adjoint groups and inner forms of Chevalley groups, showing that the strong approximation property is restrictive.

See also
Superstrong approximation

References

Algebraic groups
Diophantine geometry